La Loche Water Aerodrome  was located adjacent to La Loche, Saskatchewan, Canada.

See also 
 List of airports in Saskatchewan
 La Loche Airport
 List of defunct airports in Canada

References 

Defunct seaplane bases in Saskatchewan